Cecil McGarry S.J. (1929-2009) was an Irish Jesuit priest and educator, who served as Provincial of the order in Ireland and rector of the Jesuit Milltown Park.
Born in Galway on January 1, 1929. He joined the Jesuits, in 1946 first at Emo Court, then Milltown Park.

In 1964 received a doctorate in theology from Pontifical Gregorian University in Rome, Italy, he took his final vows in Italy in 1964. He returned to Ireland and taught at the Jesuit School of Theology, Milltown Park, before being appointed it Rector. In 1968 he was appointed Provincial of the order.

Under his leadership, the Jesuit School of Theology became the Milltown Institute of Theology and Philosophy in 1968. 

As Provincial he supported the establishment of the Irish School of Ecumenics in Milltown in 1970 and its founder Michael Hurley S.J. through his disputes with the hierarchy.

Following his service in Ireland he served in Africa (where he served for 25 years), in Kenya and joined the East African Province of the Jesuits.

He died on November 24, 2009, and his funeral was held in St. John Evangelist Church, Nairobi, Kenya, and he is buried in the Jesuit cemetery in Mwangaza retreat centre.

References

1929 births
2009 deaths
20th-century Irish Jesuits
21st-century Irish Jesuits
Pontifical Gregorian University alumni
People from County Galway